At least two ships of the French Navy have been named Tramontane:

 , a  launched in 1901 and struck in 1920.
 , a  launched in 1924 and sunk in 1942.

French Navy ship names